This is a list of notable past students and staff of Caulfield Grammar School and/or Malvern Memorial Grammar School (amalgamated with Caulfield in 1961). Alumni of the school are known as "Caulfield Grammarians" and are supported by the Caulfield Grammarians' Association.

N.B. Years of attendance in brackets.
All persons listed were students, unless otherwise indicated.
MMGS = Student of Malvern Memorial Grammar School.



A
 Charles Abbott (1951–56) – VFL footballer; polo player; Dux of School (1956). 
Dean Anderson (1980–85) – Australian Football League (AFL) footballer
Allan Ashbolt (1935–37) – actor, theatre critic, ABC broadcaster, foreign correspondent and journalist
David Astbury (2007–08) – AFL footballer

B

William Macmahon Ball AC (1916–17) – psychologist; diplomat; broadcaster
 Ernest Judd Barnett (Staff 1888–1896) – Second owner and principal of Caulfield Grammar School
Russell Basser (1972–77) – Medical researcher; water polo player at the 1984 Summer Olympics
Sir John Clifford Valentine Behan (1894–95) – first Victorian Rhodes Scholar; warden, Trinity College of the University of Melbourne
Hamish Blake (1994–96) – member of comedic duo Hamish & Andy
Hugh Boyd DSO (1900–?) – VFL footballer with University.
Jordan Brown (Australian soccer) (2009–2014) – Melbourne Victory soccer player
Tomas Bugg (2009–2011) – AFL footballer GWS and Melbourne
Martyn Arnold Buntine (1904–?) – Australian rules footballer who played for the St Kilda Football Club, educationalist.
 Walter Murray Buntine (Staff 1896–1931) – third owner and principal of Caulfield Grammar School

C 

Phill Calvert (1969–75) – musician
 George Cassidy (1917–1921) – VFL footballer (Melbourne).
Nick Cave (1971–75) – musician; author
Mark Chaffey (1990–95) – AFL footballer
Chris Christiansen (1921–22)  – physicist; engineer
Stephanie Clarkson (2012-2017)  – Nobody / Daughter of AFL superstar Alastair Clarkson.</ref>
Michael Clyne (1950–56) – linguist
Ken Coghill (1959–62) – former Speaker of the Victorian Legislative Assembly
James Connor (2008–10) – diver
Noel Counihan (1928) – social realist painter.
Finlay Crisp (1929) – academic
 Claude Terrell Crowl (1903–1905) – VFL footballer, died during landing at Anzac Cove on 25 April 1915.
Penny Cula-Reid (2000–05) – AFL Women's footballer
Alexander Charles Cumming (1895–97) – analytical, physical, and industrial chemist; academic; Doctor of Science (1906), industrial chemist

D
 Irving Davidson (1943-?) - VFL footballer with St Kilda, and VFA footballer with Brighton.
Brett Deledio (2005) – AFL footballer

 Alex Denney (1939–1942) – VFL footballer with Collingwood
Peter McCallum Dowding (1948–56) – former Premier of Western Australia
Peter Hogarth Doyle AO OBE (Mil.) (1925–2007) – Rear-Admiral, Royal Australian Navy

E
Hans Ebeling MBE (1919–22)  – Australian Test Cricketer
Robert Eddy (2004–05) – AFL footballer
Austin Burton Edwards (1916–27) – geologist; academic; Dux of school 1926
Ron Evans AM (1951–56) – Victorian Football League (VFL) footballer; AFL Chairman; businessman

F
Sir James Alexander Forrest (1920–22) – lawyer; businessman
Matthew Foschini (2003–08) – football (soccer) player
Robert Fowler OBE (Mil.) (1900–02) – obstetrician; gynaecologist; surgeon; soldier

G

 Richard Horace Maconchie "Dick" Gibbs MC (1908–1911), VFL footballer, medical student, soldier, died in action in World War I.
 Herbert Marcus Glasscock (1916–1918) VFL Footballer.
Brendon Goddard (2001–03) – AFL footballer
Robert Cuthbert Grieve VC (1899–1957) – World War I veteran; Victoria Cross recipient
Philip Lewis Griffiths KC (1894–?) – jurist
 Geoff Grover (1949–1960) – Australian Rules Footballer with St Kilda and Port Melbourne (VFA State Representative, ANFC Carnival 1966)

H

 Mick Harvey (1969–75) – musician, Nick Cave & The Bad Seeds
 Edward George Honey (1895–?) – journalist; suggested the idea of a moment of silence to remember the World War I Armistice Treaty.
Mack Horton (2000–14) – swimmer and 2016 Summer Olympics gold medalist
 John Martin Hull (Staff) – Theologian; editor British Journal of Religious Education.
 Herbert Humphreys Hunter (1896–99) – VFL footballer, dentist, killed in action at Gallipoli Cove on 8 May 1915.

I

J

 Paul Jennings AM (1956–60) – author
Nick Jewell (1988–95) – Victorian cricketer; AFL footballer
 Murray Johnstone (1931–1942) – VFL footballer (St Kilda)
 Chris Judd (1996–2001) – AFL footballer; Brownlow Medallist (2004, 2010)

K
Peter Karmel AC CBE (1929–39) – economist; academic
Norman Kaye (Staff 1958–1977) – actor; musician
Andrew Kellaway (1988–93) – AFL footballer
Charles Kellaway MC (1900–?) – scientist
Duncan Kellaway (1985–90) – AFL footballer
Steve Kons (1977–82) – Tasmanian politician; former Deputy Premier of Tasmania
Alice Kunek – professional basketball player

L
Hugh Gemmell Lamb-Smith (Staff; 1913–1951) – Australian educator who, as a member of the Second Field Ambulance, landed at Anzac Cove on 25 April 1915.
 John Landy AC CVO MBE (MMGS 1935–44) – Olympic athlete; former Governor of Victoria
 Frank Langley (1896–?) – VFL footballer with Melbourne, VFL state representative 1903, 1904
 Henry Thomas Langley (1892–95) – Church of England clergyman, army chaplain, Dean of Melbourne (1942)
 Jason Lea (1952–58) – Managing Director, Darrell Lea Chocolates; Chairman, Family Business Association
 Thomas Leather (1926-26) — VFL footballer with North Melbourne, and a Victoria Sheffield Shield cricketer who played in four "unofficial" Tests against India in the Australian "First Class" team that toured Ceylon and India in 1935–36.
 Dylan Lewis (1985–90) – television personality

M

Tamsyn Manou (1994–96) – Olympic athlete
Gordon Mathison (1896–1900) – Medical researcher, died in the Battle of Gallipoli
Noel Maughan (1949–54) – Victorian State politician
Stuart Maxfield (1984–89) – AFL footballer
George Arnot Maxwell KC (Staff) – barrister; Member of the Australian House of Representatives
Campbell McComas AM (1964–65) – humorist; writer; actor
Liam McIntyre (1987–1999) – Actor
John William "Mick" McLaren (1943–1953) – Australian rules footballer with St Kilda
David McMillan (1970–72) – convicted drug dealer
Peter McPhee AM (1961–65) – academic
Andrew McQualter (2002–04)  – AFL footballer
Rod Menzies (1957–63) – entrepreneur
Agnes Milowka (1994–99) – technical diver, underwater photographer, author, and cave explorer
David Morgan AO (MMGS 1952–?) – former CEO of the Westpac Banking Corporation
Shona Morgan (1997–2005) – Olympic gymnast
 John Morrison AM (Staff ?1950–1963) – Author: ALS Gold Medal 1963, Patrick White Literary Award 1986.
Sir Alister Murdoch KBE CB (1922–28) – Royal Australian Air Force officer

N
 Stephen Newport (1981–83) – AFL footballer with Melbourne and St Kilda
 Stephen Newton AO (Staff 1993–2011) – principal of Caulfield Grammar School
 Nikolai Nikolaeff (1996–2000) – Australian actor currently starring in Sea Patrol

O
Jenna O'Hea (2005–06) – professional basketball player
James Ryan O'Neill (born Leigh Anthony Bridgart in 1947), convicted murderer and suspected serial killer
 William Matthew O'Halloran (student 1950-1953; member of staff 1958-1959; 1963-1966), Victorian cricketer, and VAFA footballer.

P
Barry Patten (1941–43)  – corporate architect
Pete Pearson (1877–1929) – elephant hunter and game ranger.
Tracy Pew (1972–75) – musician, bass player in The Birthday Party
Bruce Pie (1916–17) – Melbourne footballer; businessman; Queensland politician
Neil Pope (?–1967) – former Victorian State politician
Trevor Ashmore Pyman (1924–34) – member of the Australian Delegation to form the United Nations

Q

R

 Roger Rayson (1947–57) – Victorian cricketer
 Stanley Simpson Reid (1886–?) – Fitzroy VFA and VFL footballer; minister; soldier. One of the first VFL footballers to die in active service (The Anglo-Boer War, 1901).
 John Robinson (1902–1911) – VFL Footballer; recipient of the Distinguished Conduct Medal (1917)
 Michael Roe (1939–48) – historian
 John Rombotis – AFL footballer with Fitzroy, Port Adelaide, and Richmond
 Kenneth G. Ross (1951–58) – playwright; Hollywood scriptwriter
 Jack Ross - AFL Footballer
 Bruce Rowland (1947–58) – composer
 Barry Rowlings (Staff) – VFL footballer
 Josh Rachele - AFL Footballer

S
John Schultz (1951–55) – VFL footballer, 1960 Brownlow Medallist
 Robert Schultz (1956-1961) — VFL footballer
Paul Seedsman (2005–2011) – AFL footballer
Will Setterfield – AFL football
David Shallcross (1966–77) – chemistry professor
Dylan Shiel (2010–2011) – AFL footballer
Neville Sillitoe (Staff) – athletics coach
Colin Hall Simpson CBE (Mil.) MC (1911) – pharmacist; Army officer; organiser The Association (1947–1952)
Callum Sinclair (2001–2007) – AFL footballer
Christopher Skase (1961–67) – controversial Australian businessman; fugitive
James Sheppard (1992-1995)-World renowned Equine Dentist
David Smith KCVO AO (MMGS 1940–?) – official Secretary to five Australian Governors-General from 1973 to 1990
Will Sparks (2006–2010) – Melbourne Bounce producer & DJ
Percival William Stephenson – former Bishop of Nelson
Allan Stone (1958–60) – Australian tennis player and tennis commentator.
Brooke Stratton (2007–11) – long jumper
 Kristy Stratton – AFLW footballer
Andrew Strauss OBE (1985–86) – English Test cricketer
 Alan Bishop Stretton AO CBE (1930–1932) – former senior Australian Army officer, VFL footballer, and Australian of the Year (1975).

T
Melissa Tapper (2005–07) – table tennis player
Herbert Taylor (1902) – accountant; company director; political party organiser
Jim Taylor (1948) – VFL footballer
Lindsay Thompson AO CMG (1929–41) – former Premier of Victoria
Murray Thompson (1963–72) – Victorian State politician; VFL footballer
Frank Timson MBE (Mil.) (1916–22) – soldier; businessman; Member of the Australian House of Representatives.
John Twycross (?–1929) – soldier; banker
 John William Twycross (1881–1888) – Australian photographer .

U

V

W

Andrew Wailes (1976–1988) Music Director and Chief Conductor of the Royal Melbourne Philharmonic Choir and Orchestra, musician, performer
Matthew Wales (1976–85) – convicted murderer
Andrew Walker (2004) – AFL footballer
Fred Walker (1899) – entrepreneur, developer of Vegemite
Ron Walker AC CBE (1944–54) – businessman; former Lord Mayor of Melbourne
Andrew Walsh AM (1967–72) – festival director
Geoff Walsh AO (1967–70) – political advisor; diplomat
 Richard Cameron Wardill (1886-1888) — VFA and VFL footballer with Melbourne.
Alfred Joseph Watson (1917–19) – athlete who represented Australia in the 1928 and 1936 Olympic Games and the 1938 Empire Games.
James Webster (1931–40) – former Australian Senator
 Richard F. Wicks (1944–1945) – VFL footballer with St Kilda    and Stawell Gift Finalist (ran fourth) in 1958

X

Y

Z
Jack Ziebell – AFL footballer

See also
 Caulfield Grammarians Football Club

References

External links
Caulfield Grammar School website
Caulfield Grammarians' Association (alumni association)
Crikey (2005). "Famous alumni on Latham's hit list". Retrieved 29 December 2009.

Caulfield Grammar
 
Caulfield Grammar
Caulfield Grammar
 List